The 2003–04 season saw West Ham United competing in the First Division for the first time since the 1992–93 season, having been relegated from the Premiership in 18th place the previous year.

Season summary
Following West Ham's relegation from the Premiership, several key players left the club that summer, including Les Ferdinand, Trevor Sinclair, Frédéric Kanouté, Joe Cole, Paolo Di Canio and Glen Johnson. Young striker Jermain Defoe had also submitted a transfer request just one day after their relegation, but this was rejected and he would remain with the club for the start of the new season. Manager Glenn Roeder, who had since recovered from the brain tumour that caused him to miss the end of the previous season, immediately set about rebuilding his squad, signing Kevin Horlock, Matthew Etherington, Rob Lee and David Connolly prior to the beginning of the campaign. After a win over Preston North End on the opening day, a draw and a loss would follow and Roeder was sacked three games into the season. Sir Trevor Brooking once again took over as caretaker manager, and form improved as they won their next four games. A permanent replacement was soon found for Roeder, when Alan Pardew was bought in from Reading as new manager in October.

Despite continuing to be a prolific goalscorer for the club, disciplinary issues became a problem for striker Jermain Defoe, who was sent off three times and played just 22 out of a possible 34 games due to suspension in the first half of the season. This, combined with his repeated refusal to sign a new contract, meant West Ham allowed him to leave the club in January to sign with Tottenham Hotspur in a swap deal that saw West Ham take out of favour striker Bobby Zamora. Along with Defoe, goalkeeper David James and club mainstay Ian Pearce would also leave for Manchester City and Fulham F.C. respectively.

Under the guidance of Pardew, West Ham performed well enough to finish fourth and earn themselves a playoff finish. They would lose 1–0 to 5th place Ipswich Town in the first leg of their playoff semi-final, but bounced back to win 2–0 in the second, advancing to the final where they would face Crystal Palace at the Millennium Stadium. A goal from Neil Shipperley after 61 minutes would be enough to give Palace the win, consigning the Hammers to another season in English football's second tier.

Final League table

First-team squad
Squad at end of season

Left club during season

Results

First Division

First Division play-offs

League Cup

FA Cup

Statistics

Overview

Goalscorers

League position by matchday

Appearances and goals

|-
! colspan=14 style=background:#dcdcdc; text-align:center| Goalkeepers

|-
! colspan=14 style=background:#dcdcdc; text-align:center| Defenders

|-
! colspan=14 style=background:#dcdcdc; text-align:center| Midfielders

|-
! colspan=14 style=background:#dcdcdc; text-align:center| Forwards

|}

References

2003-04
West Ham United
West Ham United
West Ham United